Hull Trinity House Academy is a secondary school in Kingston upon Hull, East Riding of Yorkshire, England.

Description

The school was established on 2 February 1787 as Hull Trinity House Marine School. Originally a private school, Hull Trinity House later became a state-funded technical school and was renamed Hull Trinity House Engineering School. The school was renamed Hull Trinity House School when it became a comprehensive. In April 2014 Hull Trinity House School converted to academy status and was renamed Hull Trinity House Academy.

Hull Trinity House Academy offers GCSEs and A Levels as programmes of study for pupils. The school continues with its maritime heritage by offering Maritime Studies as a dedicated separate course.

History 

Initially a boys only school, in September 2022 it admitted female students for the first time.

References

External links
Hull Trinity House Academy official website

Secondary schools in Kingston upon Hull
Boys' schools in the East Riding of Yorkshire
Educational institutions established in 1787
1787 establishments in England
Academies in Kingston upon Hull
Delta schools